The IdeaPad S12 is a line of consumer-oriented netbook computers designed by Lenovo. It is a model in the IdeaPad series and their first netbook to have a 12" screen. The computers were put on the market in 2009 and currently come in black and white.

Description
It contains either an Intel Atom N270 1.6 GHz processor or a Via Nano 1.3 GHz processor. They support 802.11 b/g wireless networking and come with three USB ports, an ExpressCard/34 expansion slot, a 4-in-1 media reader, VGA and HDMI outputs and an ethernet port. The S12 is one of the first netbooks to support nVidia's ION platform for mobile HD video playback.

Past revision
The IdeaPad S12 has a base price of (USD) $449 for the Intel Atom N270 model and (USD) $429 for the Via Nano ULV 2250. It features a 12.1" 1280×800 WXGA display with a 160GB hard disk drive, which can be upgraded by removing the keyboard and 1GB DDR2 SDRAM, which is easily upgraded via a user access panel on the bottom of the netbook.

Current lineup
The S12 was revised on 22 October 2009 and is priced between (USD) $399 and $649. It comes with either Windows XP Home Edition or Windows 7 Home Premium, a 160–320 GB hard drive, and 1–3 GB of RAM.

References

External links

S12
Netbooks